Oprah's Book Club 2.0 is a book club founded June 1, 2012, by Oprah Winfrey in a joint project between OWN: The Oprah Winfrey Network and O: The Oprah Magazine. The club is a re-launch of the original Oprah's Book Club, which ran for 15 years and ended in 2011, but as the "2.0" name suggests, digital media is the new focus. It incorporates the use of various social media platforms (Facebook, Twitter) and e-readers that allow for the quoting and uploading of passages and notes for discussion, among other features.

On March 25, 2019, Apple Inc. and Oprah announced a revival of a video version of Oprah's Book Club that will air on Apple TV+.

History
The book club was announced June 1, 2012. Critics at the time pointed out that her online audience was not as large as it was previously with network television, and the new club would be a test if she still had the "Oprah Effect" with the reading public to create hits as before. As the New York Times Book Review reported a few months later, in the August 19 issue, Cheryl Strayed's Wild had dropped off the New York Times Best Seller List by May 20, but after its selection by Oprah in early June, it reached No. 1 Non-fiction by July 15, and stayed there for many weeks, thus, said the Times, confirming the "Oprah Effect" still worked.

Oprah's Book Club 2.0 selections

Controversies
On January 21, 2020, Oprah announced her next book club selection would be American Dirt by Jeanine Cummins. The novel, about a Mexican woman fleeing to America after being targeted by a drug cartel, came under scrutiny as Cummins was a white woman with no connection to Mexico and marketing for the book claimed she had a special connection to the material because her husband had at one point been an undocumented immigrant without ever revealing he was a white Irishman. 142 authors including R. O. Kwon, Tommy Orange and Valeria Luiselli penned an open letter asking Oprah to rescind her endorsement of the book.

My Dark Vanessa by Kate Elizabeth Russell was originally selected for March 2020, but dropped after Russell was accused, without evidence, of plagiarizing Wendy C. Ortiz's 2014 memoir Excavation. According to the Associated Press, "Reviewers who looked at both books saw no evidence of plagiarism."

References

External links
Oprah's Book Club 2.0, official website.
 Video announcement.

Book Club 2.0
2012 establishments in the United States
Book promotion